Concerto for Two Pianos and Orchestra may refer to:

In music
Concerto for Two Pianos and Orchestra, by Luciano Berio
Concerto for Two Pianos and Orchestra, Op. 30, by Lennox Berkeley
Concerto for Two Pianos and Orchestra (Bruch), by Max Bruch
Concerto for Two Pianos and Orchestra in E major (Mendelssohn), by Felix Mendelssohn
Concerto for Two Pianos and Orchestra in A-flat major (Mendelssohn), by Felix Mendelssohn
Piano Concerto No. 10 (Mozart), by Wolfgang Amadeus Mozart
Concerto for Two Pianos and Orchestra (Poulenc), by Francis Poulenc
Concerto for Two Pianos and Orchestra (Vaughan Williams), by Ralph Vaughan Williams